Model Town Assembly constituency is one of the seventy Delhi assembly constituencies of Delhi in northern India.
Model Town assembly constituency is a part of Chandni Chowk (Lok Sabha constituency).
Model town is one of the posh areas in the North Delhi region. It is divided into parts viz.
Model town 1
Model town 2
& Model town 3.

Members of Legislative Assembly
Key

Election results

2020

2015 
 
 }}

2013

2008

2003

1998

1993

References

Assembly constituencies of Delhi
Delhi Legislative Assembly